Szilárd Keresztes (born July 19, 1932 in Nyíracsád, Hungary) is a Hungarian Greek Catholic bishop. He had been Bishop of Hajdúdorog and apostolic administrator of the Apostolic Exarchate of Miskolc from 1975 to 2008.

Life
He studied philosophy and theology between 1950 and 1955 at the Greek Catholic Major Seminary of Nyíregyháza. He was ordained priest by Bishop Miklós Dudás OSBM of Hajdúdorog in 1955. He earned a doctorate in sacred theology in 1957 at the Pázmány Péter Academy of Theology in Budapest. He served as parish pastor in Kispest, Budapest from 1957 to 1960. Between 1960 and 1970 he was associate pastor and chanter in Nyíregyháza, where he also taught philosophy, dogmatic theology and catechetics. In 1966 he won a scholarship to study at the Pontifical Oriental Institute in Rome, Italy as a student of the Pontifical Hungarian Institute for three years, where he obtained a licentiate in eastern theology. In 1970 he was made a canon of the Cathedral of Hajdúdorog, in 1975 parish administrator in Nyíregyháza.

Bishop's work
On January 10, 1975, Pope Paul VI appointed him titular bishop. 1975th On February 8, 1975, dr. Imre Timko consecrated him in Nyíregyháza and Szeged Cserháti Joseph Joachim bishop of Pécs assistants. From 1975 to 1988 he was assistant bishop vicar of Budapest and in Miskolc he was the Apostolic Vicar General Governorship. From 1984 until 1988 in the Eastern Kódexrevíziós Pontifical Commission he worked. Between 1987-1988 was rector of the Roman Pontifical Institute of Hungary. On June 30, 1988, Pope John Paul II named him Hajdúdorog diocesan bishop and Apostolic Exarchate of Miskolc. On February 28, 2000 he celebrated the consecration of a bishop. Pope John Paul II greeted him by a personal letter.

Professional offices
1988-1990 Committee member of the Pontifical Oriental Kódexrevíziós.

1989-94 to the members of the Congregation for Eastern Churches.

2000th September 11, from the immigrants and members of the Pontifical Council Útonlevők.

By 2008, the Hungarian Catholic Bishops' Conference Committee for Migration and the Economic Commission chairman.

Educational institutions founded

Saint Nicholas Nursery School, Nyíregyháza

The St. Nicholas was founded in 1990 kindergarten Cross Solid Hajdúdorog bishop Nyíregyháza. The preparations, after the state returned music school building (Bethlen G Street) started its activities in the kindergarten in September 1996. Then the bishop in May 2004 devoted to the new building (Whistle Street), with effect from 1 September to kindergarten there.

Greek Catholic Education Centre, Hajdúdorog

Solid Cross in June 1991 the Greek Catholic Grammar School founded by the Basilian monks run by, established in 1942 Hajdúdorog Hungarian Greek Catholic Fiúlíceum Cantor and Teacher-Training Institute site. By 1998, the old monastery was built around the building complex which houses the education building, a chapel and school house. 2006th From September 1 Greek Catholic Education Centre operates under the name of the institution

Saint Nicholas Nursery, Miskolc

Miskolc Greek Catholic Primary School

Újfehértó Greek Catholic Preschool

Formal and social distinctions
The Hungarian Government "Award for Minorities" (1996)

Hajdúdorog Freeman of the City (1996)

The Hungarian Order of Merit Cross (1997)

Bocskai Award (2000)

Tolerance Award (2004)

Pro Comitatu charge (2008)

External links
 http://www.magyarkurir.hu/?m_op=view&id=18892
 http://www.atanaz.hu/HDEM/puspok/keresjub.htm
 http://szentbazil.hu/
 http://dragon.intrex.hu/szentmiklosovoda/
 http://gorkataltisk.uw.hu/
 http://www.magyarkurir.hu/?m_op=view&id=2426
 http://www.magyarkurir.hu/?m_op=view&id=5856
 http://www.magyarkurir.hu/?m_op=view&id=980
 http://www.bucsujaras.hu/tanulmany/gkszemle/2005/keresztes3.htm
 http://www.radiovaticana.org/index.html
 http://www.gorogkatolikus.hu/

1932 births
Living people
20th-century Eastern Catholic bishops
21st-century Eastern Catholic bishops
Hungarian Eastern Catholics
Hungarian bishops
People from Hajdú-Bihar County
Bishops of the Hungarian Greek Catholic Church
Pontifical Oriental Institute alumni
Pázmány Péter Catholic University alumni